Arvieu is a commune in the Aveyron department in the Occitanie region of southern France.

The inhabitants of the commune are known as Arvieunois or Arvieunoises.

Geography
Arvieu is located some 23 km south by south-east of Rodez and 7 km north of Alrance. Access to the commune is by the D56 road from Pont-de-Salars in the north-east passing through the commune and the village and continuing south to Durenque. The D82 branches off the D56 north of the village and goes north to Flavin. The D577 branches off the D56 in the south of the commune and goes west to Salmiech. The commune is entirely farmland except for some small patches of forest.

The eastern border of the commune is the Lac de Pareloup. The Céor river rises in the east of the commune and flows west through the village then south forming part of the western border before continuing west to join the Viaur at Saint-Just-sur-Viaur. The Ruisseau de Glauzeilles rises in the north of the commune flowing west then south-west, forming the north-eastern border of the commune, to join the Céor. The Ruisseau de Calieres rises in the east of the commune and flows north to join the Vioulou just north of the commune.

Places and hamlets

Les Auglanes
Aurifeuille
Beauregard
Bel-Air
Bellevue
Le Besset
Bois de Nouet
Bois Grand
Bonneviale
Le Bose
La Brauge
La Calmette
Caplongue
Cayras
Cayras Bas
Les Cazals
Clauzelles
Clauzellou
Les Combes
Le Coutal
La Croix de l'Ouradou
Dournets
Dours
Espinous
Espinouset
Fau du Dours
Les Faux
Font Bonne
Fouleties
Galinieres
Gilergues
Ginestous
Girman Bas
Girman Haut
La Graille
Grelac
Lalic
La Lumiere
Mas Roux
Le Mas Roussel
Le Mas Vayssettes
Montginoux
Montredon
Le Mouli
Le Moulin d'Aigles
Le Moulin de la Gineste
N.-D d'Aures
Pareloup
Le Pouget
La Pendarie
Pierrefiche
Pauhle Rouby
La Pendarie
La Plane
Le Puech
Puech d'Anglas
Puech Cabane
Le Puech de Clauzelles
Puech d'Espinous
Puech de Girman
Le Puech Granier
Puech de Grima
Puech Grimal
Le Rhan
Les Rials
Rochers du Diable
le Roucan
Rougeviale
Routaboul
Le Rueillou
Saint-Martin des Faux (partly in Arvieu and partly in Salles-Curan)
Serieux
Les Sottes
Tredos
Ventajou

Neighbouring communes and villages

History
There are traces of the Gallo-Romans
In the 16th century the village was besieged
In the 18th century the Vigouroux family of Rodez bought the Lordship
The Arvieu Affair: The village was attacked by a band of counter-revolutionaries from the former Army of Charrié who hid in the Palanges Forest. The house of Citizen Bonnefous, the leading citizen of the commune, was pillaged. Many people were accused of supporting the attackers who were from the de Barrau family of Carcenac-Salmiech. 
The ramparts were destroyed in the 19th century.

Heraldry

Administration
List of Successive Mayors

Mayors from 1941

Population

Culture and heritage

Civil heritage
A Feudal Château Sainte-Famille (a former convent).
The Château of Saint-Louis (now the Town Hall).
The Château of Montfranc (Arvieu, private property).
A Pond, Mill, and Lavoir (Public laundry) at Arvieu.

Religious heritage

The Church of Notre-Dame d'Aures (12th centuries) is registered as an historical monument. The church contains a Statue of Saint Foy (15th century) which is registered as an historical object.
The Parish Church of Saint-Amans at Arvieu had a Painting: The Assumption of the Virgin (disappeared) (1850) which is registered as an historical object.
The Church of Saint-Saturnin or Saint-Sernin at Caplongue.
The Church of Saint-Martin at Faux.
The Chapel of Saint-André at Clauzelles.

Notable people linked to the commune 
 Jean Dupin, (1936-), former senior Post Office official, wrote seven novels set in Lévézou, originally from Arvieu village.
 Joël Serin, former secretary in the Town Hall.
 Henri Grimal, born in Arvieu in 1910, academic and historian.

See also
Communes of the Aveyron department

Bibliography
Christian-Pierre Bedel, preface by Bernard Destours, Cassanhas: Arviu, Auriac, Caumont, La Grand'Vila, Saumièg, Senta-Jaleda or Christian-Pierre Bedel e los estatjants del canton de Cassanhas, Rodez, Mission départementale de la culture, 1996, Al canton collection, 240 pages, ill., couv. ill., 28 cm, ISSN 1151-8375, BnF 366930046 /(Occitan)

References

External links
 Arvieu official website 
 Arvieu tourism website 
 Arvieu on the National Geographic Institute website 
Arvieu on Géoportail, National Geographic Institute (IGN) website 
Arvieu on the 1750 Cassini Map

Communes of Aveyron